The 1989 OFC Women's Championship was the third OFC Women's Championship of women's association football (also known as the OFC Women's Nations Cup). It took place in Brisbane, Australia from 26 March to 1 April 1989. Five teams participated in the tournament, and a total of eleven matches were played.

Chinese Taipei won the tournament for the second time after beating New Zealand 1–0 in the final. The third place match between Australia and their B-side was cancelled due to waterlogged pitch.

Teams 
The following five teams participated in the tournament:
  (also known as Australia Green)
  Australia B (also known as Australia Gold)
 
 
 
  withdrew after the team was refused permission to participate by the Indian government, which was "not satisfied it had reached a sufficiently high standard to compete".

Results

First round

Third place match

Final match

Awards

Statistics

Goalscorers 
 9 goals
  Huang Yu-chuan
 5 goals
  Amanda Crawford
 4 goals
  Janine Riddington
 3 goals
  Hsieh Su-chen
 2 goals

 Carol Vinson
 Wendi Henderson

 1 goal

 Leanne Priestley
 Angela Iannotta (for Australia B)
 Jane Oakley (for Australia B)
 Yen Chun-mei
 Che Hsiu-fang
 Chen Yueh-mei
 Julia Campbell
 Kim Nye
 Deborah Pullen
 Geraldine Eka

Overall ranking

References

External links 
 OFC Site

1989
OFC
Women
1989
1989 in New Zealand association football
1989 in Australian soccer
March 1989 sports events in Australia
April 1989 sports events in Australia
Sport in Brisbane